The Chief of the Air Staff (CAS) is the professional head and highest ranking military officer of the Nigerian Air Force. The position is often occupied by the most senior commissioned officer appointed by the Commander-in-Chief of the Armed Forces of Nigeria. The post was created in 1963 with Colonel Gerhard Kahtz of the German Air Force as the first incumbent. The current and 21st Chief of the Air Staff is Air Marshal Isiaka Oladayo Amao, who succeeded Air Marshal Sadique Abubakar in January 2021.

List of chiefs
The following have served as Chief of the Air Staff:

References

Nigeria
Nigerian Air Force
Nigerian military appointments